This is a list of mayors of Moerdijk, Netherlands.

In 1997 the municipality of Zevenbergen was created by the fusion of the municipalities of Fijnaart en Heijningen, Klundert, Standdaarbuiten, Willemstad and Zevenbergen. In 1998 the municipality was renamed to Moerdijk.

Mayors of Dutch municipalities are appointed by the cabinet in the name of the monarch, with advice of the city council.

Mayors of Moerdijk

References 

Mayors in North Brabant
People from Moerdijk
Moerdijk